Sun Caged is the debut full-length studio album by the Dutch progressive metal band Sun Caged, released on 22 October 2003 by Lion Music. The album was mixed by Arjen Lucassen.

Track listing 
 "Sedation" − 7:57
 "Sun Caged" − 6:23
 "Home" − 6:37
 "Soil" − 6:52
 "Hollow" − 5:12
 "Closing In" − 5:58
 "The Eighth Day" − 5:41
 "Secrets of Flight" − 9:07
 "Unchanging" − 5:09

Credits

Band members 
 Marcel Coenen − guitars
 Dennis Leeflang − drums
 Rob Van Der Loo − bass
 Joost van den Broek − keyboards
 André Vuurboom − vocals

Other 
 Drums and guitars recorded at Studio Moskou, Utrecht, The Netherlands, engineered by Silvia Vermeulen.
 Bass, keyboards and vocals recorded at Joost's home-studio, engineered by Joost van den Broek.
 Mixed by Arjen Anthony Lucassen at The Electric Castle.
 Mastered by Peter van 't Riet at Sound Factory, Rotterdam, The Netherlands.
 Photos by Nico Wobben and Petra Guijt.
 Artwork and layout by Marco Jeurissen / 101 images at www.101images.com.

References

Sun Caged albums
2003 debut albums